The 1972–73 Philadelphia 76ers season was their 24th season in the NBA and tenth in Philadelphia. Coming off a 30–52 record in the previous season, the 76ers lost their first 15 games of the season and a few months later, went on a then-record 20 game losing streak in a single season.

Their record following the 20 game losing streak was 4–58, and the team at that point had just lost 34 of 35 games. The 76ers finished the season with a 9–73 record, earning the nickname from the skeptical Philadelphia media of the "Nine and 73-ers." The 76ers finished an NBA-record 59 games behind the Atlantic Division champion Boston Celtics. These 9 wins by this 1972–73 squad is the 4th fewest in NBA history (to the 6 games won by the Providence Steamrollers in the 48-game 1947–48 season, the 7 games won by the Charlotte Bobcats in the lockout-shortened 66-game 2011–12 season and the 8 games won by the Vancouver Grizzlies in the lockout-shortened 50-game 1998–99 season.

The 73 losses, although threatened many times (including by the 2015–16 Sixers, who themselves lost 72 that season), remains the all-time low-water mark for any NBA franchise in an 82-game non-lockout season. The 76ers .110 winning percentage was the all-time worst mark in the NBA until the 2011–12 Charlotte Bobcats finished with a .106 winning percentage, whilst their −12.1 points per game point differential has been underdone only by the 2011–12 Bobcats (−13.9 points per game) and the 1992–93 Dallas Mavericks (−15.2 points per game). Only six seasons earlier, the 76ers had set the NBA record for most wins in a season and the highest winning percentage.

Offseason
The Sixers ownership offered the head coaching job to Marquette University head coach Al McGuire, and former University of Kentucky head coach Adolph Rupp, who was seventy years old at the time. Both refused the job. Only Hal Greer remained on the roster from the 1966–1967 NBA Championship Team.  The 1972–73 season would be his last in the NBA.

1972 NBA Draft

Roster

<noinclude>

Season
By the start of the 1972–73 season, most of the core of the 76ers 1966-67 championship team was gone.  In the 1972 offseason, coach Jack Ramsay left to coach the Buffalo Braves, while a court order allowed All-Star forward Billy Cunningham to bolt to the ABA. Only Hal Greer, who was 36 years old, remained. Poor trades and draft selections over the years left the team with only a few quality players.

The 76ers finished the 1971–72 season with a 30–52 record and could not find a coach for the upcoming season. In desperation, management placed an ad in The Philadelphia Inquirer for a head coach. A friend of Irv Kosloff recommended Roy Rubin, the head coach at LIU Brooklyn Blackbirds. While Rubin had 11 years coaching in college basketball, he had no professional or major college experience to draw on.

The Sixers, whose roster included the likes of Manny Leaks, Jeff Halliburton, Mike Price, John Q. Trapp and Dave Sorenson, started the season 0–15 and later lost 20 consecutive games. Players criticized Rubin for his sloppy practices and the lack of meaningful comments during time-outs and breaks. Dave Wohl, who was traded to Portland, called Rubin a ‘con man’. With the club record at 4–47, Rubin was fired and replaced by Sixers player Kevin Loughery. The team’s performance improved slightly, going 5–26 with a .161 winning percentage, compared with Rubin's .078 mark.

In their 1st win of the season (a 114–112 victory over Houston), coach Rubin actually injured himself by pulling a leg muscle. The top statistical leaders were Fred Carter (who led the team with 20 points per game), Tom Van Arsdale (with 17.7 points per game), and Leroy Ellis (with 13.7 points and 10.8 rebounds per game).

As bad as their season was, it would have been far worse if not for a 5–2 run the team put together in the last two weeks of February 1973. By Valentine's Day 1973 the 76ers' record stood at 4–58 or a .065 winning percentage which actually put on a pace to finish with an unimaginable 5–77 record. However, the team surprisingly won 5 of their next 7 games against some of the best competition in the league. 3 of those 5 wins came against teams that would eventually win fifty or more games that year – Baltimore, the 60-win Milwaukee Bucks and the 57–25 eventual NBA Champion New York Knicks. They improved to 9–60 and actually doubled their winning percentage (up from .065 to .130 during that run.) However, the 76ers lost their remaining 13 games to finish 9–73. Before the 1972–73 season the previous mark for fewest wins in an 82-game schedule was 15, and no subsequent NBA team won fewer than 22 until the 1979–80 Detroit Pistons who finished 16–66.

Season standings

Record vs. opponents

Anatomy of a demise
Two and a half months after Philadelphia's collapse against the Boston Celtics in the 1968 NBA Playoffs, Wilt Chamberlain was traded to the Los Angeles Lakers. In return, the Sixers received Darrall Imhoff, Archie Clark and Jerry Chambers.

The background of the deal can be traced back to Sixers owners Ike Richman and Irv Kosloff. Chamberlain indicated that Richman promised him part ownership of the club, but Richman died before the deal was completed. When Kosloff became sole owner, he refused to honor the agreement Chamberlain had reached with Richman. This infuriated Chamberlain, and he contemplated retirement or bolting to the ABA. Chamberlain then expressed a desire to play in Los Angeles and suggested a trade.  On paper, the deal made some sense from the Sixers' perspective, since general manager Jack Ramsay was not willing to risk letting Chamberlain get away for nothing. In the long run, however, the Sixers didn't get nearly enough in return.

After the 1967–68 season, head coach Alex Hannum bolted to the ABA, and Ramsay named himself head coach.  He decided that Clark, Imhoff and Chambers would be part of a smaller, quicker, fast-breaking team. This plan had never truly materialized. Imhoff spent only 2 seasons with the 76ers, Clark spent three, while Chambers never played for Philadelphia after spending two years in the military before being traded. Luke Jackson, Chamberlain's intended successor, suffered a major injury in the 1968-69 season and was never the same player after that. Chet Walker was dealt to the Chicago Bulls for Jim Washington, a role player.

Another contributing factor to the poor season was Philadelphia's first-round draft choices from 1967 through 1972. Selections such as Craig Raymond, Shaler Halimon, Bud Ogden, Harris Ahmad, Al Henry, Dana Lewis and Fred Boyd made no impact with the club, while Philadelphia passed on drafting future stars such as Nate Archibald and Calvin Murphy.

Ramsay did coax 55 victories out of the 1st 76ers team he coached in 1968–69. That number dipped into the 40s for the next 2 seasons, and sunk even further to 30 in 1971–72—the 1st time they had missed the playoffs in franchise history (dating back to their tenure as the Syracuse Nationals).

Game log

|-align="center" bgcolor="edbebf"
| 1 || October 10 || @ Chicago Bulls || 89–95 || Chicago Stadium || 0–1
|-align="center" bgcolor="edbebf"
| 2 || October 11 || Seattle SuperSonics || 100–105 || Philadelphia Spectrum || 0–2
|-align="center" bgcolor="edbebf"
| 3 || October 13 || Buffalo Braves || 101–104 || Philadelphia Spectrum || 0–3
|-align="center" bgcolor="edbebf"
| 4 || October 17 || @ Buffalo Braves || 114–122 || Buffalo Memorial Auditorium || 0–4
|-align="center" bgcolor="edbebf"
| 5 || October 21 || @ New York Knicks || 88–111 || Madison Square Garden || 0–5
|-align="center" bgcolor="edbebf"
| 6 || October 23 || @ Boston Celtics || 85–105 || Boston Garden || 0–6
|-align="center" bgcolor="edbebf"
| 7 || October 25 || Cleveland Cavaliers || 108–113 || Philadelphia Spectrum || 0–7
|-align="center" bgcolor="edbebf"
| 8 || October 28 || Milwaukee Bucks || 92–96 || Philadelphia Spectrum || 0–8
|-align="center" bgcolor="edbebf"
| 9 || October 31 || @ Cleveland Cavaliers || 116–126 || Cleveland Arena || 0–9
|-

|-align="center" bgcolor="edbebf"
| 10 || November 1 || Houston Rockets || 104–108 || Philadelphia Spectrum || 0–10
|-align="center" bgcolor="edbebf"
| 11 || November 3 || Kansas City–Omaha Kings || 101–114 || Philadelphia Spectrum || 0–11
|-align="center" bgcolor="edbebf"
| 12 || November 4 || @ Atlanta Hawks || 120–128 || Omni Coliseum || 0–12
|-align="center" bgcolor="edbebf"
| 13 || November 5 || @ Milwaukee Bucks || 113–131 || Milwaukee Arena || 0–13
|-align="center" bgcolor="edbebf"
| 14 || November 8 || @ Kansas City–Omaha Kings || 107–125 || Omaha Civic Auditorium || 0–14
|-align="center" bgcolor="edbebf"
| 15 || November 10 || New York Knicks || 106–125 || Philadelphia Spectrum || 0–15
|-align="center" bgcolor="bbffbb"
| 16 || November 11 || N Houston Rockets || 114–112 || (San Antonio, Texas) || 1–15
|-align="center" bgcolor="edbebf"
| 17 || November 12 || @ Phoenix Suns || 108–119 || Arizona Veterans Memorial Coliseum || 1–16
|-align="center" bgcolor="edbebf"
| 18 || November 16 || @ Golden State Warriors || 106–128 || Oakland Arena || 1–17
|-align="center" bgcolor="edbebf"
| 19 || November 17 || @ Seattle SuperSonics || 92–105 || Seattle Center Coliseum || 1–18
|-align="center" bgcolor="edbebf"
| 20 || November 19 || @ Los Angeles Lakers || 95–135 || The Forum || 1–19
|-align="center" bgcolor="edbebf"
| 21 || November 24 || N Buffalo Braves || 96–105 || (Hershey, Pennsylvania) || 1–20
|-align="center" bgcolor="edbebf"
| 22 || November 25 || Portland Trail Blazers || 106–117 || Philadelphia Spectrum || 1–21
|-align="center" bgcolor="bbffbb"
| 23 || November 28 || @ Buffalo Braves || 101–94 || Buffalo Memorial Auditorium || 2–21
|-align="center" bgcolor="edbebf"
| 24 || November 29 || New York Knicks || 91–139 || Philadelphia Spectrum || 2–22
|-

|-align="center" bgcolor="edbebf"
| 25 || December 1 || Boston Celtics || 99–105 || Philadelphia Spectrum || 2–23
|-align="center" bgcolor="edbebf"
| 26 || December 2 || @ Boston Celtics || 120–131 || Philadelphia Spectrum || 2–24
|-align="center" bgcolor="bbffbb"
| 27 || December 6 || Kansas City–Omaha Kings || 122–117 || Philadelphia Spectrum || 3–24
|-align="center" bgcolor="edbebf"
| 28 || December 7 || N Phoenix Suns || 102–117 || (Pittsburgh, Pennsylvania) || 3–25
|-align="center" bgcolor="edbebf"
| 29 || December 8 || Chicago Bulls || 102–118 || Philadelphia Spectrum || 3–26
|-align="center" bgcolor="edbebf"
| 30 || December 9 || @ New York Knicks || 109–120 || Madison Square Garden || 3–27
|-align="center" bgcolor="edbebf"
| 31 || December 12 || @ Baltimore Bullets || 102–123 || Baltimore Civic Center || 3–28
|-align="center" bgcolor="edbebf"
| 32 || December 13 || Los Angeles Lakers || 90–128 || Philadelphia Spectrum || 3–29
|-align="center" bgcolor="edbebf"
| 33 || December 16 || Buffalo Braves || 103–126 || Philadelphia Spectrum || 3–30
|-align="center" bgcolor="edbebf"
| 34 || December 20 || @ Detroit Pistons || 113–141 || Cobo Hall || 3–31
|-align="center" bgcolor="edbebf"
| 35 || December 22 || @ Houston Rockets || 103–116 || Hofheinz Pavilion || 3–32
|-align="center" bgcolor="edbebf"
| 36 || December 23 || @ Atlanta Hawks || 112–124 || Omni Coliseum || 3–33
|-align="center" bgcolor="edbebf"
| 37 || December 27 || N Atlanta Hawks || 120–121 || (Pittsburgh, Pennsylvania) || 3–34
|-align="center" bgcolor="edbebf"
| 38 || December 30 || N Boston Celtics || 107–117 || (Providence, Rhode Island) || 3–35
|-

|-align="center" bgcolor="edbebf"
| 39 || January 2 || @ Buffalo Braves || 110–114 || Buffalo Memorial Auditorium || 3–36
|-align="center" bgcolor="edbebf"
| 40 || January 5 || @ Portland Trail Blazers || 102–135 || Memorial Coliseum || 3–37
|-align="center" bgcolor="edbebf"
| 41 || January 6 || @ Golden State Warriors || 79–111 || Oakland Arena || 3–38
|-align="center" bgcolor="bbffbb"
| 42 || January 7 || @ Seattle SuperSonics || 85–82 || Seattle Center Coliseum || 4–38
|-align="center" bgcolor="edbebf"
| 43 || January 9 || @ Chicago Bulls || 110–126 || Chicago Stadium || 4–39
|-align="center" bgcolor="edbebf"
| 44 || January 10 || Los Angeles Lakers || 96–120 || Philadelphia Spectrum || 4–40
|-align="center" bgcolor="edbebf"
| 45 || January 12 || N Cleveland Cavaliers || 109–113 || (Pittsburgh, Pennsylvania) || 4–41
|-align="center" bgcolor="edbebf"
| 46 || January 13 || Boston Celtics || 95–111 || Philadelphia Spectrum || 4–42
|-align="center" bgcolor="edbebf"
| 47 || January 15 || @ Kansas City–Omaha Kings || 108–135 || Municipal Auditorium || 4–43
|-align="center" bgcolor="edbebf"
| 48 || January 16 || @ Milwaukee Bucks || 92–108 || Milwaukee Arena || 4–44
|-align="center" bgcolor="edbebf"
| 49 || January 17 || Atlanta Hawks || 105–122 || Philadelphia Spectrum || 4–45
|-align="center" bgcolor="edbebf"
| 50 || January 19 || N Baltimore Bullets || 94–110 || (Hershey, Pennsylvania) || 4–46
|-align="center" bgcolor="edbebf"
| 51 || January 21 || @ Baltimore Bullets || 97–108 || Baltimore Civic Center || 4–47
|-align="center" bgcolor="edbebf"
| 52 || January 26 || @ Cleveland Cavaliers || 100–105 || Cleveland Arena || 4–48
|-align="center" bgcolor="edbebf"
| 53 || January 28 || Buffalo Braves || 96–101 || Philadelphia Spectrum || 4–49
|-align="center" bgcolor="edbebf"
| 54 || January 30 || @ Buffalo Braves || 104–105 || Buffalo Memorial Auditorium || 4–50
|-align="center" bgcolor="edbebf"
| 55 || January 31 || Golden State Warriors || 115–131 || Philadelphia Spectrum || 4–51
|-

|-align="center" bgcolor="edbebf"
| 56 || February 2 || @ Detroit Pistons || 104–114 || Cobo Hall || 4–52
|-align="center" bgcolor="edbebf"
| 57 || February 3 || Boston Celtics || 100–104 || Philadelphia Spectrum || 4–53
|-align="center" bgcolor="edbebf"
| 58 || February 4 || @ Boston Celtics || 115–123 || Boston Garden || 4–54
|-align="center" bgcolor="edbebf"
| 59 || February 6 || N Houston Rockets || 117–123 || (San Antonio, Texas) || 4–55
|-align="center" bgcolor="edbebf"
| 60 || February 9 || @ Portland Trail Blazers || 105–116 || Memorial Coliseum || 4–56
|-align="center" bgcolor="edbebf"
| 61 || February 10 || @ Phoenix Suns || 121–126 || Arizona Veterans Memorial Coliseum || 4–57
|-align="center" bgcolor="edbebf"
| 62 || February 11 || @ Los Angeles Lakers || 90–108 || The Forum || 4–58
|-align="center" bgcolor="bbffbb"
| 63 || February 14 || Milwaukee Bucks || 106–104 || Philadelphia Spectrum || 5–58
|-align="center" bgcolor="bbffbb"
| 64 || February 16 || Detroit Pistons || 119–106 || Philadelphia Spectrum || 6–58
|-align="center" bgcolor="edbebf"
| 65 || February 17 || @ New York Knicks || 89–107 || Madison Square Garden || 6–59
|-align="center" bgcolor="bbffbb"
| 66 || February 18 || New York Knicks || 114–98 || Philadelphia Spectrum || 7–59
|-align="center" bgcolor="edbebf"
| 67 || February 23 || N Houston Rockets || 116–138 || (Hershey, Pennsylvania) || 7–60
|-align="center" bgcolor="bbffbb"
| 68 || February 25 || N Portland Trail Blazers || 115–111 || (Pittsburgh, Pennsylvania) || 8–60
|-align="center" bgcolor="bbffbb"
| 69 || February 28 || Baltimore Bullets || 102–96 || Philadelphia Spectrum || 9–60
|-

|-align="center" bgcolor="edbebf"
| 70 || March 2 || Atlanta Hawks || 107–130 || Philadelphia Spectrum || 9–61
|-align="center" bgcolor="edbebf"
| 71 || March 4 || @ Atlanta Hawks || 130–138 || Omni Coliseum || 9–62
|-align="center" bgcolor="edbebf"
| 72 || March 7 || New York Knicks || 94–120 || Philadelphia Spectrum || 9–63
|-align="center" bgcolor="edbebf"
| 73 || March 9 || N Chicago Bulls || 84–104 || (Hershey, Pennsylvania) || 9–64
|-align="center" bgcolor="edbebf"
| 74 || March 10 || Seattle SuperSonics || 96–106 || Philadelphia Spectrum || 9–65
|-align="center" bgcolor="edbebf"
| 75 || March 11 || N Golden State Warriors || 93–97 || (Pittsburgh, Pennsylvania) || 9–66
|-align="center" bgcolor="edbebf"
| 76 || March 14 || Phoenix Suns || 114–120 || Philadelphia Spectrum || 9–67
|-align="center" bgcolor="edbebf"
| 77 || March 17 || Baltimore Bullets || 115–120 || Philadelphia Spectrum || 9–68
|-align="center" bgcolor="edbebf"
| 78 || March 18 || @ Baltimore Bullets || 118–129 || Baltimore Civic Center || 9–69
|-align="center" bgcolor="edbebf"
| 79 || March 20 || @ Cleveland Cavaliers || 105–131 || Cleveland Arena ||9–70
|-align="center" bgcolor="edbebf"
| 80 || March 21 || Cleveland Cavaliers || 109–112 || Philadelphia Spectrum || 9–71
|-align="center" bgcolor="edbebf"
| 81 || March 23 || Houston Rockets || 112–132 || Philadelphia Spectrum || 9–72
|-align="center" bgcolor="edbebf"
| 82 || March 25 || N Detroit Pistons || 96–115 || (Pittsburgh, Pennsylvania) || 9–73
|-

|-
| 1972–73 Schedule

Awards and records
 Fred Boyd, NBA All-Rookie Team First Team

References

External links
 1972–73 Philadelphia 76ers on Basketball Reference

Philadelphia
Philadelphia 76ers seasons
Philadel
Philadel